Karin Johanna Söderström  (born 28 January 1985) is a Swedish Olympic sailor. She finished 14th in the Laser Radial event at the 2008 Summer Olympics.

References

External links

Swedish female sailors (sport)
Olympic sailors of Sweden
Laser Radial class sailors
Royal Gothenburg Yacht Club sailors
Sailors at the 2008 Summer Olympics – Laser Radial
1985 births
Living people
Place of birth missing (living people)